Madame Aema 10 (애마부인 10 - Aema Buin 10) is a 1994 South Korean film directed by Suk Do-won. It was the tenth entry in the Madame Aema series, the longest-running film series in Korean cinema.

Plot
This time in the Madame Aema series, Aema leaves her husband, tired of his demanding ways. She moves to Jeju Island and lives with her friend, Young-ju. She begins having an affair with a member of a Samul nori group. Shocked by Young-ju's lesbian advances, and persuaded by her boyfriend, Aema returns to her husband.

Cast
 O No-a: Madame Aema
 Won Seok: F
 Go Hyeong-jun: Husband
 Yu Mi-hee: Young-ju
 Yoo Seong: Mok-dong
 Han Yeong-nam: Man
 Hong Seong-mi: Seon-a
 Kim Tae-hwan: Man 1
 Choe Ha-neul: Man 2

Bibliography

English

Korean

Notes

Madame Aema
1994 films
1990s erotic films
1990s Korean-language films
South Korean sequel films